Pivara was one of five city municipalities which constituted the City of Kragujevac. The municipality was formed in May 2002, only to be dissolved in March 2008.

Inhabited places

The Municipality of Pivara comprised the following settlements:

References

External links

Šumadija
Defunct urban municipalities of Kragujevac
Šumadija District